Daisy Eagan is an American actress.

Early life
Eagan was born in Brooklyn to a Jewish family. Her mother, Andrea Boroff Eagan, was a medical writer; she died when Eagan was 13. Her father, Richard Eagan, is a visual and performing artist. Daisy Eagan was inspired to become an actress at age 6 after seeing him perform.

Career 
In 1991, she won the Tony Award for Best Performance by a Featured Actress in a Musical for playing Mary Lennox in The Secret Garden. She was nominated for a Drama Desk Award for Outstanding Actress in a Musical and an Outer Critics Circle Award for Best Actress in a Musical for the role. At eleven years old, she is the youngest female to win a Tony to date (as of 2021), and is the second youngest person to win a Tony (Frankie Michaels was one month past his 11th birthday when he won his Tony for Mame).

In 1992, Eagan sang "Broadway Baby" in the concert Sondheim: A Celebration at Carnegie Hall.

She appeared in the Blank Theatre Company's production of The Wild Party in 2005 in Los Angeles as the street waif, and is the recipient of the 2005 LA Weekly Theater Award for Best Supporting Actress in a Musical.

She appeared in the Manhattan Concert Productions presentation of The Secret Garden at David Geffen Hall in February 2016 as the housemaid Martha. She reprised her role as Martha in 2016 at the Shakespeare Theatre Company in Washington, D.C.; this production then moved in 2017 to the 5th Avenue Theatre in Seattle.

Her film work includes Losing Isaiah (1995), Ripe (1996) and Tony n' Tina's Wedding (2004)

She has appeared on television in episodes of Without a Trace (2007), The Unit (2006), Ghost Whisperer (2006), Numb3rs (2006), The Mentalist (2012) and Girls (2017).

Personal life
Eagan attended Bard College at Simon's Rock and graduated from Antioch University in Los Angeles with a Bachelor of Arts in psychology and creative writing.

In 2003, she married Patrick Comer, a financial consultant; they divorced in 2006. Eagan lives in New York with her child, Monty, and his father, Kurt Bloom, whom she married on May 6, 2020. Eagan first came out as gay to her parents when she was 12; she currently identifies as "queer poly," and is also in a relationship with Ryan Holsather, who is polyamorous and nonbinary.

Daisy Eagan is non-binary and uses she/they pronouns.

References

External links
 
 

LGBT Jews
LGBT people from New York (state)
Living people
Actors from New York City
American film actors
American musical theatre actresses
American television actors
Musicians from Brooklyn
Non-binary musicians
Tony Award winners
20th-century American actors
21st-century American actors
Queer actors
American non-binary actors
Polyamorous people
21st-century LGBT people
Year of birth missing (living people)